Body Language is an American game show produced by Mark Goodson Productions. The show aired on CBS from June 4, 1984, until January 3, 1986, and was hosted by Tom Kennedy. Johnny Olson announced until his death in October 1985; Gene Wood and Bob Hilton shared the announcing duties afterward, and had substituted on occasion before that.

The show pitted two teams against each other, each consisting of a contestant and a celebrity guest, in a game of solving word puzzles; the words in said puzzles were relayed by playing charades, which followed the game play of the earlier game show Showoffs while adding an element seen in the more recent Password revival series of the time.

Main game
Two rounds were played, with each team receiving one turn per round. On a team's turn, one member stood behind a podium while the other was shown a series of five words or phrases, one at a time, and had to get their partner to guess as many of them as possible in 60 seconds. The clue-giver was not allowed to speak or use any props, including their own clothing, but had to use gestures to communicate the target words/phrases; any violation of this rule forfeited the rest of the team's time. The clue-giver could pass on a word and return to it after playing through all five if time allowed.

Each word puzzle consisted of seven blanks, two of which stood for words that were not shown to the clue-giver. Each correctly guessed word was placed into the puzzle and the guesser was given a chance to guess. A correct answer awarded money to the team.

If the guesser did not solve the puzzle, the guesser on the opposing team chose a blank to reveal and then offered a guess. The teams alternated in this manner until one guesser solved the puzzle. If neither of the guessers solved it after all seven blanks were filled, the clue-givers were then allowed one guess each. If neither of them could solve it, the solution was revealed and the money carried over to the next puzzle. If, after time ran out, the original clue-giver revealed a word that had not been guessed, the opposing team received the first chance at the puzzle.

In the first round, each puzzle was worth $100, and the celebrities gave clues while the contestants guessed. The team members traded roles for the second round, with the puzzle value increased to $250. The first team to reach $500 won the championship; due to the scoring structure, this could only be accomplished if the same team won the money for both puzzles in the second round. If neither team had reached $500, one more puzzle was played with no clues acted out. The two contestants took turns revealing one blank at a time and offering a guess, and the champion contestant decided who would start. The first contestant to solve the puzzle won the game and an additional $250.

Beginning with the sixth week of the series, parentheses were placed around the two words in each puzzle that were not available to be acted out. Starting on September 3, 1985 and continuing for the rest of the run, any contestant who got their celebrity partner to guess all five words during the second round won a $500 bonus, which did not affect the scores.

Bonus round
In the first half of the bonus round, one team member had 60 seconds to act out up to 10 words or phrases. Originally, the celebrity gave the clues; starting on June 10, 1985, the contestant had the choice to give or receive the clues. As in the main game, the clue-giver could pass on a word and return to it if time allowed. Each correct guess awarded $100. An illegal clue eliminated only the current word instead of ending the round.

For the second half, the clue-giver had to act out three new words or phrases in 20 seconds. Guessing all three multiplied the first-half total by 10, for a maximum bonus of $10,000; a failure awarded the first-half total to the player. Any illegal clue ended this half of the bonus round immediately.

Champions/Returning players rule
Originally, contestants remained on the show until losing once in the main game, playing five bonus rounds, or reaching the $25,000 winnings limit that was in effect for CBS game shows at the time, whichever came first. On September 24, 1984, the rules were changed to allow either six attempts at the bonus round or two main-game losses. The winnings limit was increased to $50,000 on October 22 of that year.

Tournaments
In the summer of 1985, Body Language had a two-month-long "Teen Week." The teens played the standard game; any winnings up to $2,500 were awarded in cash, while anything over that amount went into a savings bond that matured on the player's 18th birthday.  During the two-month-long Teen Week, getting all five words in the second round netted a special bonus prize that was different every time it was won, such as a Commodore 64 computer. The prize/ticket cue for the show was reworked and later used as the Classic Concentration theme.

Broadcast history

The idea for the TV series Body Language originated with the Milton Bradley board game of the same name, which was created by Dr. Cody Sweet, the first platform speaker on nonverbal communication (body language), in 1974. Goodson and Bill Todman had previously used the format on the short-lived game show Showoffs, which aired on ABC in 1975.

Body Language replaced the second version of Tattletales at 4:00 PM (Eastern)/3:00 PM (Central/Mountain/Pacific). Although its sole network competition on ABC, The Edge of Night, was nearing the end of a long run, the game struggled nonetheless because many local affiliates had for years preempted the network feed at that time in favor of syndicated programming, which likely brought in larger advertising revenues.

Although some stations tape-delayed the show for broadcast the next morning, Body Language still managed only a fraction of the audience that daytime games such as The Price Is Right and The $25,000 Pyramid did. As such, CBS canceled the show on January 6, 1986, in favor of a revival of Goodson's Card Sharks, which necessitated a move of Press Your Luck to the 4:00 PM time slot beginning that day. Eight months later, after Press Your Luck aired its last episode on September 26, 1986, CBS returned the 4:00 PM timeslot to its affiliates.

All episodes of Body Language were taped in studio 33 at CBS Television City in Hollywood.

Near the end of Body Language's broadcast run, host Tom Kennedy also hosted The Nighttime Price Is Right. His hair had visibly grayed by the time Body Language began production, and he dyed his hair brown to host Price (as daytime host Bob Barker was still doing at the time; Barker reverted to his natural white hair in 1987). Kennedy can be seen with his hair dyed brown in Body Language's later episodes.

In popular culture
Two clips of an episode featuring Betty White as a celebrity partner were shown on a third-season episode of Hot in Cleveland in 2012 titled "How Did You Guys Meet, Anyway?" The footage was digitally altered to include a nametag on White that read "Elka", to make it appear that White's character, Elka Ostrovsky, was appearing as a contestant.

Episode status
All episodes are intact. Game Show Network has aired the show at various times since 1994.
Body Language was also seen in select markets on Fremantle's Buzzr station, beginning on June 1, 2015 and again on January 19, 2020. The show continued to air until September 24, 2021.

Pilots
Three pilots for the series were made on October 9, 1983. The only change in the front game was the scoring, with puzzles worth $100–$200–$300–$400, and $500 was needed to win the main game. Future actress Anne-Marie Johnson, was a contestant on one of the pilots; Johnson had also appeared as a contestant on Goodson-produced Child's Play earlier in 1983.

The endgame was called "7 Chances." Two puzzles were shown with the requisite 7 blanks. The celebrity chose the blank to be revealed, and the contestant tried to guess the puzzle. If the contestant got both puzzles, they won $7,000 + $1,000 per leftover chance. If they got one puzzle, that contestant won $500.

Other differences include the set, which looked much greener, and the use of the theme song. The theme song was Working Girl March by Dave Grusin, from the 1982 film Tootsie. In addition, the theme was also later used for other unsold Goodson-produced game show pilots of Star Words in 1983 and On a Roll in 1986. Also, the win cue from the endgame "7 Chances"  was also used from Mindreaders and later on, the 1980 pilot of Puzzlers and the 1983 pilot of Star Words.

One of the three pilots later aired on Buzzr as part of their "Lost and Found" week on September 11, 2015.

References

External links

A short promo for "Body Language" from 1984

1980s American game shows
1984 American television series debuts
1986 American television series endings
CBS original programming
Television series by Mark Goodson-Bill Todman Productions
Television series by Fremantle (company)
English-language television shows